A Touch of Jazz may refer to:

 "A Touch of Jazz (Playin' Kinda Ruff Part II)", 1982 song by Zapp
 "A Touch of Jazz", 1987 song by DJ Jazzy Jeff & The Fresh Prince from the album Rock the House
 A Touch of Jazz, production company founded DJ Jazzy Jeff